Sami Martin Saif (born 1972) is a Danish award-winning documentary filmmaker.

Sami Saif graduated from the National Film School of Denmark in 1997 having made the short The UFO War. He then started work on Danish broadcaster DR mainly in the TV Children and Youth Department.

In 2000, Sami Saif directed The Video Diary of Ricardo Lopez, based on the final days of Ricardo Lopez who was obsessed with Icelandic singer-songwriter Björk. It is a touching journey seeking to find his missing father aided by his then-girlfriend, Phie Ambo. Other films winning or being nominated for awards were Dogville Confessions (2003) and Tommy (2010) about singer, composer and musician Tommy Seebach.

Filmography 
Documentaries
 2000: The Video Diary of Ricardo López (credited as Sami Martin Saif)
 2001: 
 2003:  (credited as Sami Martin Saif)
 2006: 
 2009: 
 2010: 
 2016: 
Documentary shorts
 1995: The UFO War (TV short)
 2004: American Short (documentary short)
 2006: Awaiting (documentary short)
Producer
 2010: Tommy

References

External links 
 

1972 births
Danish documentary film directors
Living people